Henry Nuttall (6 February 1855 – 8 October 1945) was an English professional cricketer who played 14 first-class cricket matches for Kent County Cricket Club between 1889 and 1894. Nuttall played as a wicket-keeper.

Nuttall was born at Crayford in Kent in 1855. He made his first-class debut for Kent against Yorkshire in 1889 at Mote Park. He went on to make a total of 14 first-class appearances for he county side, his final match coming in May 1894 against MCC.

Nuttall died at Bedgebury Cross in Kent in October 1945 aged 90.

References

External links

1855 births
1945 deaths
People from Crayford
English cricketers
Kent cricketers
Wicket-keepers